Stamnoctenis pearsalli is a species of geometrid moth in the family Geometridae. It is found in North America.

The MONA or Hodges number for Stamnoctenis pearsalli is 7357. They tend to keep their wings up when landed, where they can be recognized by the line visible on the lower part of their wing.

References

Further reading

External links

 

Stamnodini
Articles created by Qbugbot
Moths described in 1914